Giga ( or ) is a unit prefix in the metric system denoting a factor of a short-scale billion or long-scale milliard (109 or ). It has the symbol G.

Giga is derived from the Greek word  (gígas), meaning "giant". The Oxford English Dictionary reports the earliest written use of giga in this sense to be in the Reports of the IUPAC 14th Conférence Internationale de Chimie in 1947: "The following prefixes to abbreviations for the names of units should be used: G giga 109×."

When referring to information units in computing, such as gigabyte, giga may sometimes mean  (230); this causes ambiguity. Standards organizations discourage this and use giga- to refer to 109 in this context too. Gigabit is only rarely used with the binary interpretation of the prefix. The binary prefix gibi has been adopted for 230, while reserving giga exclusively for the metric definition.

Pronunciation

A prominent example of this latter pronunciation is found in the pronunciation of gigawatts in the 1985 film Back to the Future.

According to the American writer Kevin Self, a German committee member of the International Electrotechnical Commission proposed giga as a prefix for 109 in the 1920s, drawing on a verse (evidently "Anto-logie") by the German humorous poet Christian Morgenstern that appeared in the third (1908) edition of his  (Gallows Songs). This suggests that a hard German  was originally intended as the pronunciation.

Common usage
 gigahertz—clock rate of a CPU, for instance, 3 GHz = 
 gigabit—bandwidth of a network link, for instance, 1 Gbit/s = .
 gigabyte—for instance, for hard disk capacity, 120 GB = ;
 gigayear or gigaannum—one billion (109) years, sometimes abbreviated Gyr, but the preferred usage is Ga.

Binary prefix
The notation  can represent 1,073,741,824 (230) bytes or 1,000,000,000 bytes. Despite international standards, the use of  = 230 B is widespread.

See also
 Binary prefix
 Gigabit Ethernet
 SI prefix
 List of commonly used taxonomic affixes
 RKM code

References

External links

 BIPM website

SI prefixes

he:תחיליות במערכת היחידות הבינלאומית#גיגה